Utriainen is a surname of Finnish origin. Notable people with the surname include:

Esa Utriainen (born 1953), Finnish javelin thrower
Jussi Utriainen (born 1978), Finnish long-distance runner
Raimo Utriainen (1927-1994), Finnish sculptor
Sanni Utriainen (born 1991), Finnish javelin thrower, daughter of Esa Utriainen

Finnish-language surnames